Salvatore is an Italian name meaning saviour. People named Salvatore include:

Given name

A
 Salvatore Accardo (born 1941), Italian violin virtuoso and conductor
 Salvatore Accursi (born 1978), Italian football player
 Salvatore Adamo (born 1943), Belgian singer
 Salvatore Adduce (born 1955), Italian politician
 Salvatore Agnelli (1817-1874), Italian composer 
 Salvatore Albano (1841-1893), Italian sculptor
 Salvatore Aldisio (1890-1964), Italian politician
 Salvatore Alepus (1503-1568), Spanish archbishop
 Salvatore Allegra (1898–1993), Italian composer
 Salvatore Aloi (born 1996), Italian football player
 Salvatore Amirante (born 1984), Italian footballer
 Salvatore Amitrano (born 1975), Italian rower
 Salvatore Andò (born 1945), Italian politician
 Salvatore Angerami (1956-2019), Italian prelate
 Salvatore Antibo (born 1962), Italian long-distance runner 
 Salvatore Antonio (fl. 1990s–2010s), Canadian actor
 Salvatore D'Aquila (1877–1928), New York City Mafia boss
 Salvatore Aquino (born 1944), Italian criminal
 Salvatore Aranzulla (born 1990), Italian blogger
 Salvatore Aronica (born 1978), Italian football player
 Salvatore Asta (1915-2004), Italian prelate
 Salvatore Attardo (fl. 1990s–2020s), Belgian professor
 Salvatore Aurelio (born 1986), Italian footballer
 Salvatore Auteri-Manzocchi (1845-1924), Italian composer
 Salvatore Avallone (born 1969), Italian footballer
 Salvatore Avellino (born 1935), American mobster

B
 Salvatore Babones (born 1969), American sociologist
 Salvatore Baccaloni (1900–1969), Italian operatic bass, buffo artist, and actor
 Salvatore Baccaro (1932–1984), Italian character actor
 Salvatore Bagni (born 1956), Italian footballer
 Salvatore Barone (born 1995), American soccer player
 Salvatore Barzilai (1860–1939), Italian journalist and politician 
 Salvatore Battaglia (born 1973) Italian light-welterweight boxer
 Salvatore "Tory" Belleci (born 1972), American filmmaker known for his role in MythBusters
 Salvatore Bellomo (1951–2019), Belgian professional wrestler
 Salvatore Bettiol (born 1961), Italian long-distance runner 
 Salvatore Boccaccio (1938–2008), Italian Roman Catholic bishop
 Salvatore Bocchetti (born 1986), Italian football defender
 Salvatore Bonafede (born 1962), Italian composer and pianist
 Salvatore "Bill" Bonanno (1932–2008), son of Mafia boss Joseph Bonanno
 Salvatore Boniello (1928–2010), Italian historian and writer
 Salvatore “Sonny” Bono (1935-1998), musician, and politician
 Salvatore Borgh (fl. 1990s–2000s), Canadian soccer player 
 Salvatore Brullo (born 1947), Italian professor of botany
 Salvatore Bruno (born 1979), Italian football striker
 Salvatore Burrai (born 1987), Italian professional footballer
 Salvatore Burruni (1933–2004), Italian flyweight and bantamweight boxer

C
 Salvatore Cassano (born 1945), fire chief of New York City, New York
 Salvatore Contorno (born 1946), former Mafioso and state witness
 Salvatore Cordileone (born 1956), American prelate of the Catholic Church, and the current Archbishop of San Francisco
 Salvatore Cuffaro (born 1958), Italian politician

D
 Salvatore Dierna (1934-2016), Italian architect

E
 Sully Erna (birth name Salvatore) (born 1968), American musician known for being lead singer and rhythm guitarist of Godsmack

F
 Salvatore Ferragamo (1898–1960), fashion designer

G
 Salvatore Ganacci, Swedish music producer and DJ
 Salvatore Giuliano (1922–1950), Sicilian bandit
 Salvatore Giunta (born 1985), US Army staff sergeant and a recipient of the Medal of Honor
 Salvatore "Sammy the Bull" Gravano (born 1945), American mobster, former underboss of the Gambino crime family
 Salvatore Greco, multiple people
 Salvatore Guaragna (1893–1981), birth name of Harry Warren, American composer

H
 Salvatore da Horta (1520–1567), Spanish saint

I
 Salvatore Inzerillo (1944–1981), Sicilian Mafioso

L
 Salvatore Lima (1928–1992), Italian politician
 Salvatore Lo Piccolo (born 1942), also known as the Baron (il Barone), Sicilian mafioso
 Salvatore Lorusso (fl. 1970s–2020s), Italian chemist and art historian
 Salvatore Lucania (1897–1962), also known as Charlie 'Lucky' Luciano, Sicilian-American mafioso

M
 Salvatore Maceo (1894–1951), Sicilian-American Mafioso
 Salvatore Maranzano (1886–1931), Sicilian-American Mafioso
 Salvatore Massaro (Eddie Lang) (1902–1933), jazz guitarist
 Salvatore Mineo (1939–1976), American actor
 Salvatore Montagna (1971–2011), former acting boss of the Bonanno crime family

P
 Salvatore Pappalardo (1817-1884), Italian composer and conductor
 Salvatore Pincherle (1853–1936), Italian mathematician

Q
 Salvatore Quasimodo (1901–1968), Italian author and poet

R
 Salvatore Riina (1930–2017), Sicilian mafioso
 Sal Rinauro (born 1982), American professional wrestler

S
 Salvatore Schillaci (born 1964), Italian football player
 Salvatore Sirigu (born 1987), Italian football player

T
 Salvatore Tavano (born 1980), Italian auto racing driver
 Salvatore Todaro, multiple people

V
 Salvatore Vasapolli (born 1955), photographer, artist
 Salvatore Valitutti (1907–1992), Italian educator and politician
 Salvatore Viganò (1769–1821), Italian choreographer, dancer and composer
 Salvatore Di Vittorio (born 1967), Italian composer and conductor
 Salvatore Vulcano (born 1976), American comedian, actor, and member of The Tenderloins

Middle name
 Dominic Salvatore Gentile (1920−1951), United States Army Air Forces officer
 John Romita Jr. (middle name Salvatore) (born 1956), comic artist

Surname
 Bennett Salvatore (born 1960), former American professional basketball referee in the National Basketball Association (NBA)
 Chris Salvatore (born 1985), American actor, singer-songwriter, model
 Dominick Salvatore (born 1940), American economist
 Federico Salvatore (born 1959), Italian singer-songwriter
 Giovanni Salvatore (ca. 1620–1688), Italian composer and organist
 Giuseppe di Salvatore (born 1989), Canadian sport shooter
 Hilary Salvatore (born 1980), American film and television actress
 Jack Salvatore Jr. (born 1989), American writer, ghostwriter, and actor
 Lucio Salvatore (born 1975), Italian-born multidisciplinary Brazilian artist
 Marco Salvatore (born 1986), Austrian professional association football player 
 Nick Salvatore (born 1943), American historian
 Nino Salvatore (1932–1997), Italian endocrinologist
 R. A. Salvatore (born 1959), fiction writer

Fictional
 Salvatore, a character in the novel The Name of the Rose
 Salvatore Leone, one of the characters featured in video games of Grand Theft Auto (series)
Salvatore Moreau, an antagonist from 2021 video game Resident Evil Village
 Salvatore "Sal" Romano, Sterling Cooper's art director in the AMC dramatic television series Mad Men
Salvatore “Sal” Tessio, a character in the 1969 novel The Godfather and its 1972 film adaptation
 Salvatore "Sal" Paradise, protagonist in the novel On the Road by Jack Kerouac
 Salvatore Bonpensiero, character from the HBO series The Sopranos
Stefan and Damon Salvatore, characters from the CW series The Vampire Diaries
 Salvatore "Creepy Sal" Kazlaukas, character in Superstore
 Damon Salvatore, a vampire from The Vampire Diaries novel series
 Stefan Salvatore, a vampire from The Vampire Diaries novel series

See also
Salvador (name)

References

Italian masculine given names
Italian-language surnames